Mads Blangstrup (born 26 February 1974) is a Danish ballet dancer. He became an apprentice with the Royal Danish Ballet in 1990 rising to the rank of principal dancer in 1998. In early 2014, he retired as an active member of the Royal Danish Ballet after performing in Kenneth MacMillan's Manon.

Biography
Born in Copenhagen, Blangstrup showed an early interest in dance, becoming a Danish champion in Latin dance when he was only nine. Thanks to the encouragement of his dancing teacher, Britt Bendixen, he entered the Royal Danish Ballet School in 1983. In 1990, he joined the company as an apprentice becoming a member of the corps de ballet in 1992, a soloist in 1997 and a principal dancer in 1998. As a principal, his roles included The Ballet Master in Flemming Flindt's The Lesson, the title role in Romeo and Juliet, the Prince in The Sleeping Beauty, various roles in Manon and Count Vronsky in Alexei Ratmansky's Anna Karenina.

Throughout his career, Blangstrup has been an enthusiastic  Bournonville dancer, as can be seen in his sensitive interpretation of James in Ulrik Wivel's film I You Love (2005) where he dances with Gudrun Bojesen in La Sylphide. With his masculine radiance, he has danced the role of prince in Swan Lake and The Sleeping Beauty but has also demonstrated his talents in more modern works by George Balanchine, Peter Martins and Tim Rushton.

Blangstrup continues to work with the Royal Danish Ballet as a character dancer and teacher.

References

Danish male ballet dancers
Royal Danish Ballet dancers
Living people
1974 births
People from Copenhagen